Informal Introduction is the debut studio album by American rapper Shade Sheist. It was released on September 10, 2002, through MCA Records. Recording sessions took place at Larrabee Studios, at Soundcastle, at Skip Saylor Recording, and at Westlake Recording Studios in Los Angeles. Production was handled by Damizza, Eddie Berkeley, KayGee, DJ Quik, Howie Hersh and Timbaland. It features guest appearances from Nate Dogg, AMG, DJ Clue, Fabolous, Hi-C, Knoc-turn'al, Kurupt, Vita and Warren G among others.

Due to little promotion, the album was not a commercial success, only reaching number 69 on the Billboard Top R&B/Hip-Hop Albums. It did, however, feature his biggest hit to date "Where I Wanna Be", which peaked at 95 on the Billboard Hot 100 and 12 on the Billboard Hot Rap Songs. The album spawned three additional singles, "Money Owners", "John Doe" and "Wake Up" all of which became minor hits on the R&B charts.

Track listing

Personnel
Tramayne Thompson – main artist, co-producer (tracks: 7, 15), co-executive producer, mixing (track 10)
Guest artists/vocalists

Henry "DJ Echo" Olortegui – featured artist (tracks: 1, 16)
Eric "DJ Vice" Aguirre – featured artist (tracks: 1, 16)
Damion Young – featured artist (tracks: 13, 16), backing vocals (track 2)
Latonya Holmes – backing vocals (track 2)
John Jackson – featured artist (track 3)
Royal Harbor – featured artist (track 3)
David Blake – featured artist (track 4)
Crawford Wilkerson – featured artist (track 4)
Jason Lewis – featured artist (track 4)
Kenyan "Swift" Martin – featured artist (track 4)
Ernesto "DJ Clue" Shaw – featured artist (track 5)
Barbara Wilson – featured artist (tracks: 6, 11), backing vocals (tracks: 6, 7, 11, 13)
Nathaniel Dwayne Hale – featured artist (tracks: 6, 9, 12, 14)
Chris "Nune" McCauley – featured artist (tracks: 6, 15)
LaVita Raynor – featured artist (track 6)
Caz – featured artist (track 7)
Timothy Mosley – featured artist (track 8)
Warren Griffin III – featured artist (track 9)
Ricardo "Kurupt" Brown – featured artist (track 14)
King Arthur – featured artist (track 15)

Instrumentalists

Damion "Damizza" Young – drums (tracks: 2, 5, 6, 10–13, 15), programming (tracks: 2, 5, 6, 10, 11, 15), percussion (tracks: 2, 6, 13, 15), keyboards (track 5)
Howard B. Hersh – bass & keyboards (tracks: 2, 5, 6, 10–13)
DeVante Swing – keyboards (track 4)
Emmanuel "DJ EMan" Coquia – scratches (track 5)
Anthony Mazza – guitar (tracks: 7, 10)
Florian Ammon – Pro Tools (tracks: 6, 7, 12, 13)
D.B. Murda – programming (track 12)
B.W.N. – programming (track 12)

Technicals

Damizza – producer (tracks: 2, 5–7, 10–13, 15), co-producer (tracks: 3, 14), executive producer, recording (tracks: 6, 7, 11, 13)
Howie Hersh – producer (track 3)
David "DJ Quik" Blake – producer & mixing (track 4)
Timothy "Timbaland" Mosley – producer & mixing (track 8)
Edward Berkeley – producer (tracks: 9, 14)
Kier Gist – producer (tracks: 9, 14)
Michael Schlesinger – mixing (tracks: 2, 5–7, 10–15), recording (tracks: 2, 5, 6, 10–15)
Jimmy Douglass – mixing (track 8)
Steve Penny – engineering (track 8)
Jeremy – recording (tracks: 6, 8)
Ray – recording (track 7)
Jason Schweitzer – recording (track 13)
Evren Göknar – mastering
Brian – additional editing (track 5)
Aaron – additional engineering (track 8)

Additional

Jesse Alvarez – art direction, design & illustration
JP Robinson – art direction, design & illustration
Manuel J. Donayre – art direction, design & illustration
David Irvin – photography
Anthony Mandler – photography
Naim Ali – A&R
Alicia N. Graham – A&R
Sujit Kundu – management, co-executive producer

Charts

Singles

References

External links

2002 debut albums
MCA Records albums
Albums produced by KayGee
Albums produced by Damizza
Albums produced by DJ Quik
Albums produced by Timbaland
Hip hop albums by American artists